M-set may refer to
 Sydney Trains M set, a class of electric train
 Set of uniqueness or Menshov set of harmonic analysis
 Mandelbrot set, a two-dimensional fractal shape
 A monoid acting on a set; see Semigroup action

Mathematics disambiguation pages